Local elections were held in most cities and municipalities of Serbia (excluding the disputed territory of Kosovo) on 21 June 2020, with repeat voting later taking place in some communities. The elections were held concurrently with the 2020 Serbian parliamentary election and the 2020 Vojvodina provincial election. Elections on all three levels were initially scheduled for 26 April 2020 but were rescheduled due to the COVID-19 pandemic in the country.

As with the republic and provincial elections, the local elections were boycotted by several opposition parties, most notably those in the Alliance for Serbia, which charged that the process was neither free nor fair. Some parties that boycotted the parliamentary election nonetheless chose to participate in the local elections in a limited capacity.

Elections were not held for the City Assembly of Belgrade, as its members were elected on a different four-year cycle (although assembly elections were held in all of the City of Belgrade's constituent municipalities). Some other jurisdictions also did not hold local elections in 2020, for the same reason.

All local elections in Serbia are held under proportional representation. Mayors are not directly elected but are instead chosen by elected members of the local assemblies. For this election, the electoral threshold was lowered from five to three per cent (of all votes, not only of valid votes). Parties representing national minority communities are exempt from the threshold requirement.

Outcome
As expected, the results were a victory for the Serbian Progressive Party's coalition, which finished in first place in most cities and municipalities. Some exceptions included jurisdictions where the majority of seats were won by parties representing national minority communities. Other exceptions included:

Beočin, where the Socialist Party of Serbia won a narrow majority victory. After a political re-alignment in mid-2022, a new coalition government was formed including the Progressives and the Socialists.
Čajetina, where Healthy Serbia leader Milan Stamatović led his coalition to a majority victory.
New Belgrade, where Serbian Patriotic Alliance leader and incumbent mayor Aleksandar Šapić led his party to a narrow victory over the Progressive Party's alliance. Šapić's party later joined the coalition government led by the Progressives at the republic level. In 2021, the Serbian Patriotic Alliance was merged outright into the Progressive Party.
Ražanj, where an independent list led by incumbent mayor Dobrica Stojković won a plurality victory. Stojković and his assembly group joined the Progressives in November 2021.
Svilajnac, where incumbent mayor Predrag Milanović won the election at the head of an independent list and was confirmed for another term in office.
Topola, where Better Serbia leader Dragan Jovanović led his party to a narrow victory over the Progressive Party's alliance. The Progressives initially formed a local coalition government with smaller parties, although the defection of some Progressive delegates in April 2021 led to the formation of a new coalition government dominated by Better Serbia.

Results

Belgrade
Local elections were held in all seventeen of Belgrade's municipalities. The Serbian Progressive Party and its allies won victories in every jurisdiction except New Belgrade, where Aleksandar Šapić's Serbian Patriotic Alliance won a narrow victory. The only other municipality where the Progressive Party and its allies did not win an outright majority was Stari Grad, where they fell two seats short.

Barajevo
Results of the election for the Municipal Assembly of Barajevo:

Incumbent mayor Slobodan Adamović of the Progressive Party was confirmed for another term in office after the election.

Čukarica
Results of the election for the Municipal Assembly of Čukarica:

Incumbent mayor Srđan Kolarić of the Progressive Party was confirmed for another term in office after the election. The Socialists and the Serbian Patriotic Alliance supported the local administration.

Nikola Dragićević, a future parliamentarian, appeared in the fifteenth and final position on the Oathkeepers list.

Grocka
Results of the election for the Municipal Assembly of Grocka:

Dragan Pantelić, elected on the For Our Children list, was chosen as mayor after the election.

Future parliamentarian Bojana Bukumirović was elected from the lead position on the Oathkeepers list.

Lazarevac
Results of the election for the Municipal Assembly of Lazarevac:

Bojan Stević of the Progressive Party was selected as mayor after the election, with the support of fifty-six out of sixty-one delegates.

Mladenovac
Results of the election for the Municipal Assembly of Mladenovac:

Incumbent mayor Vladan Glišić of the Progressive Party (not to be confused with the national assembly member of the same name) was confirmed for another term in office after the election.

New Belgrade
Results of the election for the Municipal Assembly of New Belgrade:

Incumbent mayor Aleksandar Šapić of the Serbian Patriotic Alliance was confirmed for another term in office after the election. The Serbian Patriotic Alliance merged into the Serbian Progressive Party in 2021.

Šapić stood down as mayor of New Belgrade in June 2022 after becoming the mayor of the City of Belgrade. He was replaced by Bojan Bovan, a longtime ally of Šapić who had been elected on the list of the Serbian Patriotic Alliance and participated in the party's merger into the Progressives.

Obrenovac
Results of the election for the Municipal Assembly of Obrenovac:

Incumbent mayor Miroslav Čučković of the Progressive Party was confirmed for a third term in office after the election. He resigned in July 2022 after being appointed as manager of the City of Belgrade. Miloš Stanojević, also from the Progressive list, was chosen as his replacement.

Palilula
Results of the election for the Municipal Assembly of Palilula:

Incumbent mayor Aleksandar Jovičić of the Progressive Party was confirmed for another term in office after the election. He resigned on 28 June 2021 after being arrested on suspicion of enabling illegal construction in the municipality. Miroslav Ivanović, also elected on the For Our Children list, was chosen as his replacement on 26 July 2021.

Rakovica
Results of the election for the Municipal Assembly of Rakovica:

Miloš Simić of the Progressive Party was selected as mayor after the election.

Dušan Stojiljković, a future member of the national assembly, appeared in the tenth position on the Oathkeepers list.

Savski Venac
Results of the election for the Municipal Assembly of Savski Venac:

Miloš Vidović of the Progressive Party was selected as mayor after the election.

Sopot
Results of the election for the Municipal Assembly of Sopot:

Živorad Milosavljević of the Progressive Party, the longest continuously serving mayor in Serbia, was confirmed for another term in office after the election.

Stari Grad
Results of the election for the Municipal Assembly of Stari Grad:

Radoslav Marjanović of the Progressive Party was chosen as mayor after the election, by a vote of forty-two to eight (with one invalid vote). The Socialist Party of Serbia–United Serbia and Serbian Patriotic Alliance lists supported Marjanović, as did some individual members of other lists. One of the Socialist delegates elected was Uglješa Marković, who was also elected to the national assembly in the concurrent parliamentary election.

Surčin
Results of the election for the Municipal Assembly of Surčin:

Incumbent mayor Stevan Šuša of the Progressive Party was confirmed for another term in office after the election.

Voždovac
Results of the election for the Municipal Assembly of Voždovac:

Ivana Ilić-Tomić of the Progressive Party was selected as mayor following the election. The new municipal administration included the Socialist Party and the Serbian Patriotic Alliance, and was approved by forty-seven members of the assembly.

Vračar
Results of the election for the Municipal Assembly of Vračar:

Incumbent mayor Milan Nedeljković of the Progressive Party was confirmed for another term in office after the election, by a vote of forty-eight to six. The Socialist Party participated in the municipality's coalition government, which was also supported by the Serbian Patriotic Alliance, the Association for the Beautification of Vračar, and the Green Movement Vračar. The United Opposition and DSS were in opposition.

Zemun
Results of the election for the Municipal Assembly of Zemun:

Gavrilo Kovačević of the Progressive Party was selected as mayor after the election. Aleksandar Šešelj was elected to the assembly at the head of the Radical Party list; he resigned on 10 September 2020.

Zvezdara
Results of the election for the Municipal Assembly of Zvezdara:

Vladan Jeremić of the Progressive Party was selected as mayor following the election, with the support of forty-six of the fifty delegates in attendance. The Socialists and the Serbian Patriotic Alliance supported the new administration.

Marija Leković was elected from the lead position on the Victory for Zvezdara list. She was also elected to the national assembly and resigned her seat in the municipal assembly on 4 September 2020.

Vojvodina

Central Banat District
Local elections were held in the one city (Zrenjanin) and all four of the municipalities in the Central Banat District. The Progressive Party and its allies won majority victories in all jurisdictions.

Zrenjanin
Results of the election for the City Assembly of Zrenjanin:

Simo Salapura of the Progressive Party was selected as mayor after the election. One of the members elected on the Socialist list was Dubravka Kralj, who was also elected to the national assembly in the concurrent parliamentary election.

Nova Crnja
Results of the election for the Municipal Assembly of Nova Crnja:

Incumbent mayor Vladimir Brakus of the Progressive Party was confirmed for another term in office after the election.

Novi Bečej
Results of the election for the Municipal Assembly of Novi Bečej:

Sečanj
Results of the election for the Municipal Assembly of Sečanj:

Incumbent mayor Predrag Rađenović of the Progressive Party was confirmed for another term in office after the election. It was noted on 1 January 2022 that he had resigned from the position. Miomira Milošević of the Progressives was appointed leader of a provisional authority pending new elections in 2022.

Žitište
Results of the election for the Municipal Assembly of Žitište:

Incumbent mayor Mitar Vučurević of the Progressive Party was confirmed for another term in office after the election.

North Bačka District
Local elections were held in the one city (Subotica) and both of the municipalities in the North Bačka District. The Progressive Party won plurality victories in Subotica and Mali Iđoš, while the Alliance of Vojvodina Hungarians won a majority victory in Bačka Topola. In all three jurisdictions, the Progressives and the Alliance of Vojvodina Hungarians formed coalition governments after the election.

Subotica
Results of the election for the City Assembly of Subotica:

The Progressives and their allies formed a coalition government with the Alliance of Vojvodina Hungarians after the election. Stevan Bakić of the Progressive Party was chosen as mayor. Bálint Pásztor, who led the Alliance of Vojvodina Hungarians list, was chosen as president of the city assembly.

Bačka Topola
Results of the election for the Municipal Assembly of Bačka Topola:

Adrian Satmari of the Alliance of Vojvodina Hungarians was chosen as mayor after the election. A member of the Progressive Party was chosen as president of the municipal assembly. Parliamentarian Árpád Fremond was elected to the local parliament on the Alliance of Vojvodina Hungarians list.

Mali Iđoš
Results of the election for the Municipal Assembly of Mali Iđoš:

Incumbent mayor Marko Lazić of the Progressive Party was confirmed for another term in office after the election. A member of the Alliance of Vojvodina Hungarians was chosen as deputy mayor.

North Banat District
Local elections were held in the one city (Kikinda) and all five of the municipalities in the North Banat District. The Progressive Party won majority victories in all but two jurisdictions: Kanjiža (where the Alliance of Vojvodina Hungarians won a majority) and Senta (where the Alliance won a plurality victory). The Progressive Party participated in coalition governments in both of the latter jurisdictions.

Kikinda
Results of the election for the City Assembly of Kikinda:

Nikola Lukač of the Progressive Party was chosen as mayor after the election.

Ada
Results of the election for the Municipal Assembly of Ada:

Incumbent mayor Zoltán Bilicki of the Progressive Party was confirmed for another term in office after the election.

Čoka
Results of the election for the Municipal Assembly of Čoka:

Incumbent mayor Stana Đember of the Progressive Party was confirmed for another term in office after the election.

Kanjiža
Results of the election for the Municipal Assembly of Kanjiža:

Incumbent mayor Róbert Fejsztámer of the Alliance of Vojvodina Hungarians was confirmed for another term in office after the election. The Progressive Party participated in the local coalition government.

Zsombor Újvári was elected on the Alliance of Vojvodina Hungarians list and was appointed to the municipal council on 21 August 2020. He was elected to the national assembly in the 2022 Serbian parliamentary election.

Novi Kneževac
Results of the election for the Municipal Assembly of Novi Kneževac:

Incumbent mayor Radovan Uverić of the Progressive Party was confirmed for another term in office after the election. He resigned in July 2021 and was replaced by Irena Slavković from the same party.

Senta
Results of the election for the Municipal Assembly of Senta:

Incumbent mayor Rudolf Czegledi of the Alliance of Vojvodina Hungarians was confirmed for another term in office after the election. His deputy was from the Progressive Party. Former mayor Zoltán Pék was re-elected to the assembly on the Alliance list after an absence of eight years.

South Bačka District
Local elections were held in the one city (Novi Sad) and all eleven of the separate municipalities of the South Bačka District. The Progressive Party and its allies won all cities and municipalities except Beočin, where the Socialist Party won a narrow majority victory. The only other jurisdiction where the Progressives and their allies did not win an outright majority was Bački Petrovac.

The City of Novi Sad comprises two municipalities (the City municipality of Novi Sad and Petrovaradin), although their powers are very limited relative to the city government. Unlike Belgrade, Niš, and Vranje, Novi Sad does not have directly elected municipal assemblies.

Novi Sad
Results of the election for the City Assembly of Novi Sad:

Incumbent mayor Miloš Vučević of the Progressive Party led the For Our Children list. He was subsequently confirmed for a third term as mayor by an assembly vote of seventy to six (with two invalid votes). The local government included the Progressives, the Socialists, the Serbian Patriotic Alliance, and the League of Social Democrats of Vojvodina; the Radicals and the Democratic Party of Serbia were in opposition. Milorad Mirčić, who served as the city's mayor in the 1990s, was re-elected to the assembly on the Radical Party list.

Bač
Results of the election for the Municipal Assembly of Bač:

Steva Panić of the Progressive Party was chosen as mayor after the election.

Bačka Palanka
Results of the election for the Municipal Assembly of Bačka Palanka:

Incumbent mayor Branislav Šušnica of the Progressive Party was confirmed for another term in office after the election.

Bački Petrovac
Results of the election for the Municipal Assembly of Bački Petrovac:

Jasna Šproh of the Progressive Party was chosen as mayor after the election, by a vote of fourteen to eleven. The Socialists supported the administration.

Bečej
Results of the election for the Municipal Assembly of Bečej:

Incumbent mayor Dragan Tošić of the Progressive Party was confirmed for another term in office following the election, with the votes of thirty-five delegates. (The thirty-sixth delegate was absent). Former mayor Vuk Radojević was elected at the head of the Progressive list.

Beočin
Results of the election for the Municipal Assembly of Beočin:

Mirjana Malešević Milkić of the Socialist Party was chosen as mayor after the election. She resigned in May 2022, and the Socialists lost their majority in the assembly after the defection of two delegates. The Progressives and Socialists formed a new coalition government in June 2022, with Biljana Janković of the Progressives as mayor.

Srbobran
Results of the election for the Municipal Assembly of Srbobran:

Radivoj Debeljački of the Progressive Party was chosen as mayor after the election.

Sremski Karlovci
Results of the election for the Municipal Assembly of Sremski Karlovci:

Aleksandar Stojkečić of the Progressive Party was chosen as mayor after the election; the Radical Party delegates boycotted the vote.

Temerin
Results of the election for the Municipal Assembly of Temerin:

Mladen Zec of the Progressive Party was chosen as mayor after the election.

Titel
Results of the election for the Municipal Assembly of Titel:

Incumbent mayor Dragan Božić of the Progressive Party was confirmed for another term in office after the election.

Vrbas
Results of the election for the Municipal Assembly of Vrbas:

Predrag Rojević of the Progressive Party was chosen as mayor after the election. The government was supported by the Progressives, the Socialists, and the Radicals.

Žabalj
Results of the election for the Municipal Assembly of Žabalj:

Incumbent mayor Čedomir Božić of the Progressive Party was confirmed for a new term in office after the election, with the support of nineteen delegates. (The other two delegates were not present.) He was succeeded by Uroš Radanović of the same party on 30 October 2020.

South Banat District
Local elections were held in both cities (i.e., Pančevo and Vršac) and all six municipalities of the South Banat District. The Progressive Party and its allies won majority victories in all jurisdictions.

Pančevo
Results of the election for the City Assembly of Pančevo:

Aleksandar Stevanović of the Serbian Progressive Party was chosen as mayor after the election.

Alibunar
Results of the election for the Municipal Assembly of Alibunar:

Zorana Bratić of the Serbian Progressive Party was chosen as mayor after the election.

Bela Crkva
Results of the election for the Municipal Assembly of Bela Crkva:

Violeta Simić of the Serbian Progressive Party was chosen as mayor after the election.

Kovačica
Results of the election for the Municipal Assembly of Kovačica:

Jaroslav Hrubik of the Serbian Progressive Party was chosen as mayor after the election.

Kovin
Results of the election for the Municipal Assembly of Kovin:

Incumbent mayor Sanja Petrović of the Serbian Progressive Party was confirmed for another term in office after the election.

Opovo
Results of the election for the Municipal Assembly of Opovo:

Miloš Markov of the Serbian Progressive Party was chosen as mayor after the election.

Plandište
Results of the election for the Municipal Assembly of Plandište:

Incumbent mayor Jovan Repac of the Serbian Progressive Party was confirmed for another term in office after the election.

Vršac
Results of the election for the City Assembly of Vršac:

Incumbent mayor Dragana Mitrović of the Serbian Progressive Party was confirmed for another term in office after the election.

West Bačka District
Local elections were held in the one city (Sombor) and two of the three municipalities of the West Bačka District; the exception was Kula, where the last local election had taken place in 2018. The Progressives and their allies won majority victories in all jurisdictions that held elections.

Sombor
Results of the election for the City Assembly of Sombor:

Antonio Ratković of the Progressive Party was chosen as mayor after the election.

Apatin
Results of the election for the Municipal Assembly of Apatin:

Dubravka Korać of the Progressive Party was chosen as mayor after the election.

Kula
There was no municipal election in Kula in 2020. The previous election had taken place in 2018, and the next election took place in 2022.

Odžaci
Results of the election for the Municipal Assembly of Odžaci:

Goran Nikolić of the Progressive Party was chosen as mayor after the election.

Šumadija and Western Serbia

Mačva District
Local elections were held in both cities (i.e., Šabac and Loznica) and all six municipalities of the Mačva District. The Progressive Party and its allies won in all jurisdictions, taking majority victories everywhere except Ljubovija (where they fell one seat short). In each jurisdiction, a Progressive Party delegate was chosen as mayor after the elections.

Šabac
The final results of election for the City Assembly of Šabac were not announced until 17 October 2020, due to three separate repeat votes having been held in the city before then. Both the process and the elections themselves were extremely acrimonious.

Aleksandar Pajić of the Progressive Party was selected as mayor of Šabac after the election. The new city assembly was boycotted by Zelenović's list, after Zelenović charged that the assembly was improperly constituted.

Bogatić
Results of the election for the Municipal Assembly of Bogatić:

Milan Damnjamović of the Progressive Party was chosen as mayor after the election, and a new local administration was formed by the Progressives, the Radicals, and the European Green Party. The Socialists, who had been in power locally for several years prior to the 2020 election, abstained from voting on the new administration.

Koceljeva
Results of the election for the Municipal Assembly of Koceljeva:

Incumbent mayor Dušan Ilinčić of the Progressive Party was confirmed for another term in office after the election.

Krupanj
Results of the election for the Municipal Assembly of Krupanj:

Incumbent mayor Ivan Isailović of the Progressive Party was confirmed for another term in office after the election. Progressive Party member Ivana Popović, who was elected to the national assembly in the concurrent 2020 parliamentary election, was also elected to a local assembly mandate.

Loznica
Results of the election for the City Assembly of Loznica:

Incumbent mayor Vidoje Petrović of the Progressive Party was confirmed for his fifth term in office following the election. The city government, which also included the Socialist Party and the Party of United Pensioners of Serbia, was endorsed by an assembly vote of fifty to five, with two invalid votes.

Ljubovija
Results of the election for the Municipal Assembly of Ljubovija:

Milan Jovanović of the Progressive Party was chosen as mayor after the election. The government was formed by the Progressives, the SDPS, and the Radicals.

Mali Zvornik
Results of the election for the Municipal Assembly of Mali Zvornik:

Incumbent mayor Zoran Jevtić of the Progressive Party was confirmed for a new term in office after the election.

Vladimirci
Results of the election for the Municipal Assembly of Vladimirci:

Goran Zarić of the Progressive Party was chosen as mayor after the election.

Moravica District
Local elections were held in the one city (Čačak) and two of the three other municipalities in the Moravica District. The Progressive Party and its allies won majority victories in all jurisdictions that held elections.

Čačak
Results of the election for the City Assembly of Čačak:

Incumbent mayor Milun Todorović of the Serbian Progressive Party was confirmed for another term in office after the election.

Gornji Milanovac
Results of the election for the Municipal Assembly of Gornji Milanovac:

Incumbent mayor Dejan Kovačević of the Serbian Progressive Party was confirmed for another term in office with the support of thirty-four delegates. The members of the Win and Save the Municipality of Gornji Milanovac list did not participate in the vote.

Ivanjica
Results of the election for the Municipal Assembly of Ivanjica:

Momčilo Mitrović of the Progressive Party was chosen as mayor after the election.

Lučani
There was no election for the Municipal Assembly of Lučani in 2020. The previous election had taken place in 2018, and the next election took place in 2022.

Pomoravlje District
Local elections were held in the one city (Jagodina) and all five other municipalities of the Pomoravlje District. United Serbia won a majority victory in its home base of Jagodina in an alliance with the Serbian Progressive Party and the Socialist Party of Serbia. The Progressive alliance won majority victories in all other jurisdictions except Svilajnac, where incumbent mayor Predrag Milanović led his independent list to a plurality victory.

Jagodina
Results of the election for the City Assembly of Jagodina:

Incumbent mayor Ratko Stevanović of United Serbia was confirmed for another term in office after the election.

Ćuprija
Results of the election for the Municipal Assembly of Ćuprija:

Jovica Antić of the Serbian Progressive Party was chosen as mayor after the election.

Despotovac
Results of the election for the Municipal Assembly of Despotovac:

Incumbent mayor Nikola Nikolić of the Serbian Progressive Party was confirmed for another term in office after the election.

Paraćin
Results of the election for the Municipal Assembly of Paraćin:

Vladimir Milićević of the Serbian Progressive Party was chosen as mayor after the election.

Rekovac
Results of the election for the Municipal Assembly of Rekovac:

Incumbent mayor Aleksandar Đorđević of the Serbian Progressive Party was confirmed for another term in office after the election.

Svilajnac
Results of the election for the Municipal Assembly of Svilajnac:

Incumbent mayor Predrag Milanović, the leader of his own independent list, was confirmed for another term in office after the election.

Gorica Gajić of the Democratic Party of Serbia was one of the two candidates elected on the "Only Forward Svilajnac" list.

Rasina District
Local elections were held in the one city (Kruševac) and all five other municipalities of the Rasina District. The Serbian Progressive Party and its allies won majority victories in all jurisdictions except Ćićevac, where they won a narrow plurality victory and formed a coalition government.

Kruševac
Results of the election for the City Assembly of Kruševac:

Incumbent mayor Jasmina Palurović of the Serbian Progressive Party was confirmed for a new term in office after the election.

Aleksandrovac
Results of the election for the Municipal Assembly of Aleksandrovac:

Incumbent mayor Mirko Mihajlović of the Serbian Progressive Party was confirmed for another term in office after the election.

Brus
Results of the election for the Municipal Assembly of Brus:

Valentina Milosavljević of the Serbian Progressive Party was chosen as mayor after the election.

Ćićevac
Results of the election for the Municipal Assembly of Ćićevac:

Mirjana Krkić of the Serbian Progressive Party was chosen as mayor after the election with the support of the Radicals and the Socialists.

Trstenik
Results of the election for the Municipal Assembly of Trstenik:

Milena Turk of the Serbian Progressive Party was chosen as mayor after the election.

Varvarin
Results of the election for the Municipal Assembly of Varvarin:

Violeta Lutovac Đurđević of the Serbian Progressive Party was chosen as mayor after the election.

Raška District
Local elections were held in the two cities (Kraljevo and Novi Pazar) and the three other municipalities of the Raška District. The Serbian Progressive Party and its allies won majority victories in the predominantly Serb municipalities of Kraljevo, Raška, and Vrnjačka Banja. The Sandžak Democratic Party won in the predominantly Bosniak city of Novi Pazar, while the Party of Democratic Action of Sandžak won in Tutin, also a predominantly Bosniak community.

Kraljevo
Results of the election for the City Assembly of Kraljevo:

Incumbent mayor Predrag Terzić of the Serbian Progressive Party was confirmed for another term in office after the election.

Novi Pazar
Results of the election for the City Assembly of Novi Pazar:

Incumbent mayor Nihat Biševac of the Sandžak Democratic Party was confirmed for another term in office after the election.

Candidates elected on the Justice and Reconciliation Party list included Amela Lukač Zoranić (list position #5) Jahja Fehratović (#6) and Misala Pramenković (#10). Fehratović resigned his seat on 21 December 2020.

Parliamentarian Enis Imamović was elected from the second position on the SDA list. He resigned on 6 August 2021.

Raška
Results of the election for the Municipal Assembly of Raška:

Incumbent mayor Ignjat Rakitić of the Serbian Progressive Party was confirmed for another term in office after the election. He was dismissed from office in October 2022 following a mutiny in the Progressive Party and was replaced by fellow party member Nemanja Popović, who received the votes of thirty-one out of thirty-three delegates who were present.

Tutin
Results of the election for the Municipal Assembly of Tutin:

Salih Hot of the Party of Democratic Action of Sandžak was appointed as mayor after the election.

Zaim Redžepović was elected from the lead position on the Justice and Reconciliation Party list. Bajro Gegić was elected from the lead position on the "Tutin in First Place" list.

Vrnjačka Banja
Results of the election for the Municipal Assembly of Vrnjačka Banja:

Incumbent mayor Boban Đurović of the Serbian Progressive Party was confirmed for another term in office after the election.

Šumadija District
Local elections were held in the one city (Kragujevac) and five of the six other municipalities of the Šumadija District. The exception was Aranđelovac, where the last election had been held in 2018.

The Progressive Party and its allies won in all jurisdictions that held elections except Topola, where Better Serbia won a narrow victory. The Progressives formed government in Topola after the election with support from smaller parties, but a political realignment in April 2021 brought Better Serbia back to power.

The only other jurisdiction where the Progressives did not win a majority was Batočina, where they fell one seat short.

Kragujevac
Results of the election for the City Assembly of Kragujevac:

Nikola Dašić of the Progressive Party was chosen as mayor after the election, with the support of seventy delegates.

Future parliamentarian Nikola Nešić, the leader of the local party New Strength (Nova Snaga), was re-elected from the second position on the independent "An Alternative" list. New Strength merged into Together for Serbia in 2021, and that party in turn merged into Together in 2022.

Mirko Čikiriz of the Movement for the Restoration of the Kingdom of Serbia was elected at the head of the For the Kingdom of Serbia list. He was subsequently appointed as an assistant mayor on 5 November 2020 with responsibility for co-operation with churches and religious communities. By virtue of holding this role, he resigned from the city assembly on 27 November.

Military trade union official Novica Antić, who entered political life in an individual capacity, received the largely symbolic twenty-ninth position out of thirty on the METLA 2000 list.

Aranđelovac
There was no municipal election in Aranđelovac in 2020. The previous election had taken place in 2018, and the next election took place in 2022.

Batočina
Results of the election for the Municipal Assembly of Batočina:

Incumbent mayor Zdravko Mladenović of the Progressive Party was confirmed for another term in office after the election.

Knić
Results of the election for the Municipal Assembly of Knić:

Srećko Ilić of the Progressive Party was chosen as mayor after the election.

Lapovo
Results of the election for the Municipal Assembly of Lapovo:

Incumbent mayor Boban Miličić of the Progressive Party was confirmed for another term in office after the election.

Rača
Results of the election for the Municipal Assembly of Rača:

Incumbent mayor Nenad Savković of the Progressive Party was confirmed for another term in office after the election.

Topola
Results of the election for the Municipal Assembly of Topola:

Igor Petrović of the Progressive Party was selected as mayor after the election, with support from the Socialists and the "New People" list. Dragan Jovanović was elected from the lead position on the Better Serbia list and initially served as leader of the opposition in the assembly.

Jovanović was expelled from the assembly in November 2020, on the grounds that he had changed his residence from Topola to Belgrade and was no longer on the local voters list. He responded that this decision was based on falsified information and that he had actually been expelled for being a "thorn in the side" of the local authorities.

Two members of the local Progressives subsequently left the party's assembly group, and a new majority was established in April 2021 by Better Serbia, with support from the Movement for the Restoration of the Kingdom of Serbia, the Serbian People's Party, and the Party of United Pensioners of Serbia. Igor Petrović left the Progressives to join Healthy Serbia and initially continued to serve as mayor. Dragan Jovanović was appointed to the city council with responsibility for infrastructure and the economy.

In March 2022, Petrović was replaced as mayor by Vladimir Radojković of Better Serbia.

Dragan Jovanović stood down from city council on 10 September 2022, having by this time been re-elected to the national assembly.

Zlatibor District
Local elections were held in the one city (i.e., Užice) and eight of the nine separate municipalities of the Zlatibor District. The exception was Kosjerić, where the previous local election had taken place in 2017.

The Serbian Progressive Party's coalition won majority victories in Užice, Bajina Bašta, Nova Varoš, Požega, and Priboj. It also won plurality victories in Arilje and Prijepolje; in both of these areas, a representative of the Progressive Party was subsequently chosen as mayor. Healthy Serbia leader Milan Stamatović led his coalition to a majority victory in Čajetina, and in Sjenica the Justice and Reconciliation Party formed government in an alliance with the Progressives.

The city of Užice is divided into two municipalities: Užice and Sevojno. The municipality of Užice does not have direct assembly elections: members of the city assembly also serve at the municipal level. Delegates to the Municipal Assembly of Sevojno are directly elected, although there was no election in 2020; the previous vote had taken place in 2018.

Užice
Results of the election for the City Assembly of Užice:

Jelena Raković Radivojević of the Serbian Progressive Party was chosen as mayor after the election.

Užice: Sevojno
There was no election for the Municipal Assembly of Sevojno in 2020. The previous election had taken place in 2018, and the next election took place in the 2022.

Arilje
Results of the election for the Municipal Assembly of Arilje:

Predrag Maslar of the Serbian Progressive Party was chosen as mayor after the election.

Bajina Bašta
Results of the election for the Municipal Assembly of Bajina Bašta:

Vesna Đurić of the Serbian Progressive Party was chosen as mayor after the election. She resigned in January 2022, prompting a new local election later that year, and was appointed as the leader of a provisional administration.

Čajetina
Results of the election for the Municipal Assembly of Čajetina:

Incumbent mayor Milan Stamatović, the leader of Healthy Serbia, was confirmed for another term in office after the election.

Bojana Božanić of Healthy Serbia was elected from the fourth position on the Healthy Serbia–Democratic Party of Serbia list. She resigned shortly after the new assembly was convened.

Kosjerić
There was no municipal election in Kosjerić in 2020. The previous election had taken place in 2017, and the next election took place in 2021.

Nova Varoš
Results of the election for the Municipal Assembly of Nova Varoš:

Incumbent mayor Radosav Vasiljević of the Serbian Progressive Party was confirmed for another term in office after the election.

Požega
Results of the election for the Municipal Assembly of Požega:

Incumbent mayor Đorđe Nikitović of the Serbian Progressive Party was confirmed for another term in office after the election.

Priboj
Results of the election for the Municipal Assembly of Priboj:

Incumbent mayor Lazar Rvović of the Serbian Progressive Party was confirmed for another term in office after the election.

Prijepolje
Results of the election for the Municipal Assembly of Prijepolje:

Vladimir Babić of the Serbian Progressive Party was chosen as mayor after the election.

Samir Tandir was elected from the lead position on the Justice and Reconciliation Party list. He left the party in May 2022, bringing the rest of its local assembly delegation with him.

Sjenica
Results of the election for the Municipal Assembly of Prijepolje:

Munib Mujagić of the Justice and Reconciliation Party was chosen as mayor after the election. The local government was supported by the Justice and Reconciliation Party, the Progressive alliance, the Socialist Party, and the two citizens' groups.

Southern and Eastern Serbia

Bor District

Local elections were held in all 4 municipalities of Bor District.

Bor

Kladovo

Majdanpek

Negotin

Braničevo District

Local elections were held in all 9 municipalities of Braničevo District, including the City of Požarevac.

City of Požarevac

Kostolac (City of Požarevac)

Veliko Gradište

Golubac

Žabari

Žagubica

Kučevo

Malo Crniće

Petrovac na Mlavi

Nišava District
Local elections were held for the City Assembly of Niš, the assemblies in all five of Niš's constituent municipalities, and the assemblies in five of the Nišava District's other six municipalities. The exception was Doljevac, where the last municipal election had been held in 2018.

The Progressive Party and its allies won majority victories in jurisdictions except Ražanj, where an independent list led by the incumbent mayor Dobrica Stojković won a plurality victory. Stojković was confirmed for another term in office following the election; in November 2021, he and his assembly group joined the Progressives.

A delegate from the United Peasant Party (aligned with the Progressives) was chosen as mayor in the party's home territory of Svrljig.

Niš
Results of the election for the City Assembly of Niš:

Dragana Sotirovski of the Progressive Party was chosen as mayor after the election, with the support of fifty-six out of sixty-one delegates.

Niš: Crveni Krst
Results of the election for the Municipal Assembly of Crveni Krst:

Incumbent mayor Miroslav Milutinović of the Progressive Party was confirmed for another term in office after the election, with the support of twenty out of twenty-one delegates.

Niš: Medijana
Results of the election for the Municipal Assembly of Medijana:

Incumbent mayor Nebojša Kocić of the Progressive Party was confirmed for another term in office after the election, with the support of twenty-one delegates.

Niš: Niška Banja
Results of the election for the Municipal Assembly of Niška Banja:

Dušan Živković of the Progressive Party was chosen as mayor after the election by a unanimous vote.

Niš: Palilula
Results of the election for the Municipal Assembly of Palilula, Niš:

Bratislav Vučković of the Progressive Party was chosen as mayor after the election.

Niš: Pantelej
Results of the election for the Municipal Assembly of Pantelej:

Nataša Stanković of the Progressive Party was chosen as mayor after the election with the support of twenty delegates.

Aleksinac
Results of the election for the Municipal Assembly of Aleksinac:

Dalibor Radičević of the Progressive Party was chosen as mayor after the election.

Doljevac
There was no election for the Municipal Assembly of Doljevac in 2020. The previous election had taken place in 2018.

Gadžin Han
Results of the election for the Municipal Assembly of Gadžin Han:

Milisav Filipović of the Progressive Party was chosen as mayor after the election. The Socialist Party and United Serbia served in opposition.

Merošina
Results of the election for the Municipal Assembly of Merošina:

Saša Jovanović of the Progressive Party was chosen as mayor after the election.

Ražanj
Results of the election for the Municipal Assembly of Ražanj:

Incumbent mayor Dobrica Stojković was confirmed for another term in office after the election. On 3 November 2021, Stojković and his entire assembly group joined the Progressive Party.

Svrljig
Results of the election for the Municipal Assembly of Svrljig:

Miroslav Marković of the United Peasant Party was chosen as mayor after the election. A member of the Progressive Party was chosen as his deputy.

Podunavlje District
Local elections were held in the one city (Smederevo) and one of the other two municipalities (Velika Plana) of the Podunavlje District. The Serbian Progressive Party and its allies won majority victories in both jurisdictions.

Smederevo
Results of the election for the City Assembly of Smederevo:

Jovan Beč of the Serbian Progressive Party was chosen as mayor after the election.

Smederevska Palanka
There was no municipal election in Smederevska Palanka in 2020. The previous election had taken place in 2018, and the next election took place in 2022.

Velika Plana
Results of the election for the Municipal Assembly of Velika Plana:

Incumbent mayor Igor Matković of the Serbian Progressive Party was confirmed for another term in office after the election.

Notwithstanding that his name appeared on the ballot, Dejan Šulkić took the twelfth position on the METLA 2020 list and was not re-elected to the assembly.

Zaječar District

Zaječar
Boško Ničić of his group of citizens was elected as Mayor of Zaječar with the support of SNS and SPS. Ničić later joined SNS.

Boljevac

Knjaževac

Sokobanja

Notes

References

Local elections in Serbia
2020 elections in Serbia
June 2020 events in Serbia